Gaston Fébus (also spelt Phoebus) (30 April 1331 – 1391) was the eleventh count of Foix (as Gaston III) and twenty-fourth viscount of Béarn (as Gaston X) from 1343 until his death.

Early life
Gaston was born either in Orthez or Foix, the eldest son of Gaston II/IX (1308–1343). As the lord's eldest son, he was given the dynastic name, Gaston. He later adopted Fébus as a nickname. In its classic spelling, Phoebus, it is one of the names of the sun-god, Apollo, and is apt because of Gaston Fébus's golden hair. His native language was Gascon (a dialect of Occitan), but he was also fluent in French. He wrote a treatise on hunting in French, and an Occitan song, Se Canta, has been ascribed to him. One contemporary chronicler, Jean Froissart, records that he "very willingly spoke to me not in his native Gascon but in proper and elegant French".

Count of Foix
Béarn had passed to the county of Foix in 1290. Gaston paid homage to the French king for Foix, but from 1347 not for Béarn. He claimed it was as an independent fief, with its seat at his stronghold at Pau, which had been fortified by the 11th century. (It became the official capital of Béarn in 1464.)

Gaston's defiance of the French king marks a break from his family's previous allegiances. His father, Gaston II, had supported the Valois dynasty, and been a thorn in the side of the English. Gaston's decision to move his alliance closer to the English orbit lies in his family's longstanding quarrel with the House of Armagnac. By the 1350s, John I, Count of Armagnac was the only man who possessed more land in southwestern France than Fébus; this led to bitter rivalry. While Armagnac had previously considered siding with the English, he was appointed the French king's royal lieutenant in Languedoc in September 1346. Armagnac's closeness with the French by this point partially explains Gaston's decision to move toward the English political orbit. Additionally, Fébus must have been encouraged to align himself with the English by his own association with Charles the bad, King of Navarre. Charles continuously defied French royal authority around this time.

For primarily these reasons, Gaston eventually became a supporter of the English king in southwestern France. When Edward the Black Prince lay waste to parts of southwestern France during his chevauchée of October–December 1355, he specifically told him men not to pillage Gaston's possessions. In fact, the two men met at the Cistercian abbey of Boulbonne during the Black Prince’s campaign. The chevauchée was directed primarily against the possessions of the Count of Armagnac.

Starting in 1374, court minutes in the sovereign viscounty were dated with reference to the lord of Béarn. He established international diplomatic relations with Navarre, Castile and Aragon, taking advantage to a large extent of the weakness of the French crown. He started a policy of rapprochement to the realms to the south of the Pyrenees. He, for example, married Agnes, daughter of Philip III and Joan II of Navarre, with the acquiescence of the French king Philip VI.

While Gaston eventually repudiated Agnes, he pursued the establishment of a Pyrenean realm under his leadership, and thus secure the control of the thriving commercial route of Toulouse-Bayonne. His intent to reinforce authority across all the area was halfhearted due to economic constraints.

Although he designated the king of France as his successor, eventually that did not happen, since the newly established Estates-General of Béarn prevented it. He was succeeded as count of Foix and sovereign viscount of Béarn by Mathieu of Foix-Castelbon.

A fortune won in battle
The House of Béarn-Foix was engaged in a long running feud with the House of Armagnac.  In 1362, a battle was fought between the two noble houses at Launac.  Fébus was victorious and succeeded in capturing his chief rivals, whom he ransomed for a vast fortune of at least 600,000 florins.  This money was stored in the Moncade tower in Orthez, where Fébus also created a gallery of portraits and military trophies to commemorate the event.

Castles 
The constructions of Gaston Fébus all have in common the same plan whatever its surface and its location. The plan is as follows: a polygonal enclosure to which are built buildings forming an interior courtyard, a quadrangular tower straddling the curtain wall (pentagonal at the Château de Moncade), sometimes a second tower, as well as a ditch spanned by a drawbridge.

Records of Jean Froissart

In late 1388, the chronicler, Jean Froissart, visited the County of Foix and recorded the splendour of Fébus' court at Orthez. He noted that Fébus describes the three "special delights" of his life as "arms, love and hunting".

Livre de chasse (Book of the Hunt)

Fébus was one of the greatest huntsmen of his day, and hunted his entire life – he died of a stroke while washing his hands after returning from a bear hunt. His Livre de chasse  (Book of the Hunt) was written between 1387 and 1389 and dedicated to Philip the Bold, Duke of Burgundy.

Recorded in the book are different stages of hunting different animals, as well as describing animal behavior, offering advice to less well-off gentry about how to enjoy hunting without bankrupting themselves, and is even sympathetic to the peasant poacher because he too has the hunting instinct.

It is the classic treatise on Medieval hunting, and was described by scholar Hannele Klemettilä as "one of the most influential texts of its era". Some forty-four 15th and 16th century illuminated manuscripts survive, the most famous being that held by the Bibliothèque nationale de France, which has exquisite miniatures, illustrating the hunt.

Marriage and children
Fébus married Agnès of Navarre (1334–1396), daughter of Joan II of Navarre and Philip III of Navarre in 1348. They had a son:
 Gaston (1361–1382), married Béatrice d'Armagnac (1362–1410), daughter of John II of Armagnac.
He was also the father of four illegitimate children:
 Garcia de Béarn, viscount of Ossau, husband of Anne de Lavedan;
 Peranudet de Béarn, died in childhood;
 Bernal de Foix died about 1381, first count of Medinaceli by his marriage to Isabel de la Cerda, lady of Huelva, Gibraleón and of Puerto de Santa María, the forefather of the dukes of Medinaceli;
 Jean de Béarn, also called Yvain de Lescar, was Fébus' favourite son, dying on 30 January 1393 without issue, of burns accidentally caused at the Bal des ardents.

Betrayal of the Count's son

As Jean Froissart records, Fébus was betrayed by his son who also bore the dynastic name, Gaston, and who tried to kill his father using poison given to him by Charles II of Navarre. Fébus caught his son in the act and imprisoned him. In a subsequent violent quarrel, Fébus stabbed his son, who died.

Following Gaston's death, Fébus had no legitimate descendants. In 1393, in Paris at a masquerade given by the Queen of France, Isabeau of Bavaria, one of Gaston Fébus's four recorded illegitimate sons, Yvain de Foix, was burned to death when his costume, along with the costumes of four others, caught fire from a torch at the Bal des Ardents.

Posterity

Popular culture 

Alexandre Dumas published a novella entitled Monseigneur Gaston Phœbus, a dramatic retelling of Froissart's account. Initially serialised in the magazine Le Siècle, it was published as an annex to the second volume of Dumas's historical novel, Acté, in 1839.

In the 20th century, the novel by Myriam and Gaston de Béarn, La Vie fabuleuse de Gaston Phœbus (1959), was a great success. This romantic trilogy was adapted to television in 1978 in Gaston Fébus: the Lion of the Pyrenees.

In March 2020, the ethnologist and ethnographer Emmanuel Larrouturou revealed that the calligraphy of Gaston Fébus' signature is an ingenious graphic device revealing, by superimposing loose sheets, various forms related to totemism.

See also

 Castle of Foix
 Château de Mauvezin

Further reading

References

Notes

Sources

 
 Cummins, John The Hound and the Hawk: The Art of Medieval Hunting Publ. Weidenfeld & Nicolson; New paperback edition (18 Jan 2001) 
 
 
 
 Febus Avant! Music at the Court of Gaston Febus, Count of Foix and Bearn (1331-1391); Huelgas Ensemble, Paul Van Nevel; Sony, 1992.

External links

 

1331 births
1391 deaths
14th-century Princes of Andorra
People from Orthez
14th-century French poets
Occitan nobility
House of Foix
Counts of Foix
Viscounts of Béarn